The Bank of Carmel was in a historic building, constructed in 1938 by architect C. J. Ryland, in Carmel-by-the-Sea, California, United States. It was Carmel's first commercial bank and the only 1930s Art Deco style building in Carmel. Artist Paul Whitman was commissioned to create two bas reliefs for the front of the bank building. In 1959, the bank merged with the Crocker National Bank ending a 36-year history as the Bank of Carmel. The structure is recognized as an important commercial building in the city's Downtown Conservation District Historic Property Survey, and was nominated and submitted to the California Register of Historical Resources on November 30, 2002.

History
 

The Bank of Carmel opened on July 15, 1923, in a building between Mission and Dolores Streets in Carmel-by-the-Sea, California. It was the first commercial bank in Carmel. Thomas Albert Work (1870-1963), of Pacific Grove, was elected president of the bank. He was president of two other banks, one in Monterey and the other in Salinas. The directors of the bank were: T. A. Work, Charles O. Goold, Barnet J. Segal, Silas V. Mack, and J. A. Sparolini. The Bank of Carmel began with capital stock of $25,000 and with capitalization of $100,000. On January 28, 1924, T. A. Work, C. O. Goold, C. A Metz, Silas W. Mack, and J. A Sparolini were re-elected as directors of the Bank of Carmel. T. A. Work was elected as president and C. O. Goold was elected as vice-president.

The bank outgrew its old building, and in 1938, T. A. Work developed plans to build a new two-story concrete building for the Bank of Carmel. The 1930s Art Deco style building included curving surfaces, glass-block windows, and speed lines. The Artist Paul Whitman was commissioned to create two bas reliefs for the front of the bank building. Two plaques represented Junípero Serra and figures of a man and schoolboy. C. J. Ryland was hired as the chief architect and William P. Sweeney as the builder. 

The bank opened on June 24, 1939, at the corner of Ocean Avenue and Delores Street. The new building had three vaults and a night depository, this being the only secured bank drop box on the Monterey Peninsula. The bank continued to grow with T. A. Work as president.

On September 25, 1959, T. A. Work decided that his three banks merge into the Crocker National Bank. The Crocker Bank continued to operate in the Carmel location until February 14, 1972, when it moved to a new building at Mission and Sixth Street, which became the Carmel Public Library Foundation, a branch of the Harrison Memorial Library. Crocker Bank sold the Bank of Carmel building to investor Douglas Linden, who sold it to Paul Laub in 1972.

Today
Today the old bank building is now the "Carmel Classics" retail store. The city of Carmel has created a Downtown Conservation District plan to protect the historic buildings. The Bank of Carmel meets criteria 3, which says: "Embodies the distinctive characteristics of a type, period, region or method of
construction or represents the work of a master or possesses high artistic values."

See also
 Carmel-by-the-Sea, California

References

External links

 City Of Carmel-By-The-Sea Downtown Conservation District Historic Property Survey

1938 establishments in California
Carmel-by-the-Sea, California
Buildings and structures in California
Bank buildings in California